Weak artificial intelligence (weak AI) is artificial intelligence that implements a limited part of mind, or, as narrow AI, is focused on one narrow task. In John Searle's terms it “would be useful for testing hypotheses about minds, but would not actually be minds”. Weak artificial intelligence focuses on mimicking how humans perform basic actions such as remembering things, perceiving things, and solving simple problems.  As opposed to strong AI, which uses technology to be able to think and learn on its own. Computers are able to use methods such as algorithms and prior knowledge to develop their own ways of thinking like human beings do.  Strong artificial intelligence systems are learning how to run independently of the programmers who programmed them. Weak AI is not able to have a mind of its own, and can only imitate physical behaviors that it can observe. 

It is contrasted with Strong AI, which is defined variously as: 
 Artificial general intelligence: a machine with the ability to apply intelligence to any problem, rather than just one specific problem. 
 Human-level intelligence: a machine with a similar intelligence to an average human being.
 Superintelligence: a machine with a vastly superior intelligence to the average human being.
 Artificial consciousness: a machine that has consciousness, sentience and mind.

Scholars like Antonio Lieto have argued that the current research on both AI and cognitive modelling are perfectly aligned with the weak-AI hypothesis (that should not be confused with the "general" vs "narrow" AI distinction) and that the popular assumption that cognitively inspired AI systems espouse the strong AI hypothesis is ill-posed and problematic since "artificial models of brain and mind can be used to understand mental phenomena without pretending that that they are the real phenomena that they are modelling"  (p. 85) (as, on the other hand, implied by the strong AI assumption).

AI can be classified as being “… limited to a single, narrowly defined task. Most modern AI systems would be classified in this category.”  Narrow means the robot or computer is strictly limited to only being able to solve one problem at a time. Strong AI is conversely the opposite. Strong AI is as close to the human brain or mind as possible. This is all believed to be the case by philosopher John Searle. This idea of strong AI is also controversial, and Searle believes that the Turing test (created by Alan Turing during WW2, originally called the Imitation Game, used to test if a machine is as intelligent as a human) is not accurate or appropriate for testing strong AI.

Terminology 

“Weak AI” is sometimes called “narrow AI”, but the latter is usually interpreted as subfields within the former. Hypothesis testing about minds or part of minds are typically not part of narrow AI, but rather implementation of some superficial lookalike feature. Many currently existing systems that claim to use “artificial intelligence” are likely operating as a narrow AI focused on a specific problem, and are not weak AI in the traditional sense. 

Siri, Cortana, and Google Assistant are all examples of narrow AI, but they are not good examples of a weak AI, as they operate within a limited pre-defined range of functions. They do not implement parts of minds, they use natural language processing together with predefined rules. They are in particular not examples of strong AI as there are no genuine intelligence nor self-awareness. AI researcher Ben Goertzel, on his blog in 2010, stated Siri was "VERY narrow and brittle" evidenced by annoying results if you ask questions outside the limits of the application.

Weak vs. strong A.I. 
The differences between weak vs. strong AI is not widely catalogued out there at the moment. Weak AI is commonly associated with basic technology like voice-recognition software such as Siri or Alexa as mentioned in Terminology. Whereas strong AI is not fully implemented or testable yet, so it is only really fantasized about in movies or popular culture media.  It seems that one approach to AI moving forward is one of an assisting or aiding role to humans. There are some sets of data or numbers that even we humans cannot fully process or understand as quickly as computers can, so this is where AI will play a helping role for us.

Impact 

Some commentators think weak AI could be dangerous because of this "brittleness" and fail in unpredictable ways. Weak AI could cause disruptions in the electric grid, damage nuclear power plants, cause global economic problems, and misdirect autonomous vehicles.

Examples 

Some examples of weak AI are self-driving cars, robot systems used in the medical field, and diagnostic doctors. The reason all of these are weak AI systems, self-driving cars can cause deadly accidents similarly to how humans normally can. Medicines could be incorrectly sorted and distributed to people. Also medical diagnoses can ultimately have serious and sometimes deadly consequences if the AI is faulty.  Another issue with weak artificial intelligence currently, is that behavior that it follows can become inconsistent.  Patterns could become difficulty to come up with one consistent system that worked every time.

Simple artificial intelligence programs have already worked their way into our society and we just might not have noticed it yet. Autocorrection for typing, speech recognition for speech to text programs, and vast expansions in the data science fields are just to name a few.  As much as weak and some strong AI is slowly starting to help out societies, they are also starting to hurt it as well. AI had already unfairly put people in jail, discriminated against women in the workplace for hiring, taught some problematic ideas to millions, and even killed people with automatic cars.  AI might be a powerful tool that can be used for improving our lives, but it could also be a dangerous technology with the potential for things to get out of hand.

Social media 
Facebook, and other similar social media platforms, have been able to figure out how to use artificial intelligence and machine learning, or more specifically weak AI, to predict how people will react to being show certain images. Weak artificial intelligence systems have been able to identify what users will identify with, based on what they post, following the patterns or trends. 

Twitter has started to have more advanced AI systems figure out how to identify weaker AI forms and detect if bots may have been used for biased propaganda, or even potentially malicious intentions. These AI systems do this through filtering words and creating different layers of conditions based on what AI has had implications for in the past, and then detecting if that account may be a bot or not. 

TikTok uses its "For You" algorithm to determine a user's interests very quickly through analyzing patterns in what videos the user initially chooses to watch. This weak AI system uses patterns found between videos to determine what video should be shown next including the duration, who has shared or commented on it already, and music played in the videos. The "For You" algorithm on TikTok is so accurate, that it can figure out exactly what a user has an interest in or even really loves, in less than an hour.

See also
 Artificial intelligence
 A.I. Rising
 Deep learning
 Expert system
 History of artificial intelligence
 Virtual assistant
 Machine learning
 Philosophy of artificial intelligence
 Artificial general intelligence
 Hardware for artificial intelligence
 Synthetic intelligence

References

Artificial intelligence
Emerging technologies
Computational neuroscience